Boulden is a surname. Notable people with the surname include:

Amy Boulden (born 1993), Welsh professional golfer
Jesse Freeman Boulden (1820–1899), US Baptist pastor and politician
Wood Boulden (1811–1876), US lawyer, plantation owner, and politician

Others with the name include:

Thomas Boulden Thompson (1766-1828), British naval officer

See also
Bouldon